Jammu and Kashmir was a region formerly administered by India as a state from 1952 to 2019, constituting the southern and southeastern portion of the larger Kashmir region, which has been the subject of a dispute between India, Pakistan and China since the mid-20th century. The underlying region of this state were parts of the former princely state of Jammu and Kashmir, whose western districts, now known as Azad Kashmir, and northern territories, now known as Gilgit-Baltistan, are administered by Pakistan. The Aksai Chin region in the east, bordering Tibet, has been under Chinese control since 1962.

After the Government of India repealed the special status accorded to Jammu and Kashmir under Article 370 of the Indian constitution in 2019, the Parliament of India passed the Jammu and Kashmir Reorganisation Act, which contained provisions that dissolved the state and reorganised it into two union territories – Jammu and Kashmir in the west and Ladakh in the east, with effect from 31 October 2019. At the time of its dissolution, Jammu and Kashmir was the only state in India with a Muslim-majority population.

History

Establishment 
After the Indo-Pakistani War of 1947–1948, the princely state of Jammu and Kashmir was divided between India (which controlled the regions of Jammu, Kashmir Valley, and Ladakh) and Pakistan (which controlled Gilgit–Baltistan and Azad Kashmir). Maharaja Hari Singh signed the Instrument of Accession on 26 October 1947 after an invasion by Pakistani tribesmen. Sheikh Abdullah was appointed as the Prime Minister of Jammu and Kashmir as part of an interim government by Maharaja Hari Singh in March 1948. In order to integrate the provisions of the instrument of accession relating to the powers of the state and Indian government, the Constituent Assembly of India drew up the draft provision named Article 306-A, which would later become Article 370.

A constituent assembly for Jammu and Kashmir was convened to frame a new constitution for the state in October 1951, after an election in which all the seats were won by the Jammu & Kashmir National Conference party of Abdullah.

Abdullah reached an agreement termed as the "Delhi Agreement" with Jawaharlal Nehru, the Prime Minister of India, on 24 July 1952. It extended provisions of the Constitution of India regarding citizenship and fundamental rights to the state, in addition to the jurisdiction of the Supreme Court of India. Agreements were also reached on issues of abolishing the monarchy, as well as the state being allowed a separate flag and official language. The Delhi Agreement spelt out the relationship between the central government and the state through recognizing the autonomy Jammu and Kashmir, while also declaring it as an integral part of India and granting the central government control of several subjects that were not a part of the instrument of accession.

The government of Jammu and Kashmir quickly moved to adopt the provisions of the agreement. The recommendations of the Drafting Committee on the Constitution of Jammu and Kashmir regarding the monarchy were accepted by the Constitutent Assembly on 21 August 1952. The Jammu and Kashmir Constitution Act 1939 was amended in November 1952 to adopt the resolutions and the monarchy was officially abolished on 12 November. The regent Karan Singh was formally elected as the Sadar-i-Riyasat or head of state by the Constitutent Assembly and was later recognized by the President of India. The amendments incorporating the provisions into the state constitution entered into force on 17 November.

Abdullah however sought to make  Article 370 permanent and began calling for the secession of the state from India, which led to his arrest in 1953. Bakshi Ghulam Mohammad became the Prime Minister of Jammu and Kashmir. The Constituent Assembly passed a resolution in February 1954, extending some provisions of the Constitution of India and formally ratifying the accession of the state to India per the Instrument of Accession. A Presidential Order was passed on 14 May 1954 to implement the Delhi Agreement, drawing its validity from the resolution of the Constitutent Assembly.

The new Constitution of Jammu and Kashmir was adopted on 17 November 1956 and came into force on 26 January 1957. Following this, the state constituent assembly dissolved itself and elections were held for the legislative assembly in 1957, with the National Conference winning 68 out of 75 seats.

In 1956–57, China constructed a road through the disputed Aksai Chin area of Ladakh. India's belated discovery of this road culminated in the Sino-Indian War of 1962; China has since administered Aksai Chin. Following the Indo-Pakistani War of 1971, India and Pakistan signed the Simla Agreement, recognising a Line of Control in Kashmir, and committing to a peaceful resolution of the dispute through bilateral negotiations.

Kashmir insurgency 
In the late 1980s, discontent over the high-handed policies of the union government and allegations of the rigging of the 1987 Jammu and Kashmir Legislative Assembly election triggered a violent uprising and armed insurgency which was backed by Pakistan. Pakistan claimed to be giving its "moral and diplomatic" support to the separatist movement. The Inter-Services Intelligence of Pakistan has been accused by India and the international community of supporting, supplying arms and training mujahideen, to fight in Jammu and Kashmir. In 2015, former President of Pakistan Pervez Musharraf admitted that Pakistan had supported and trained insurgent groups in the 1990s. India has repeatedly called Pakistan to end its "cross-border terrorism" in Kashmir.

Since 1989, a prolonged, bloody conflict between the Islamic militant separatists and the Indian Army took place, both of whom have been accused of widespread human rights abuses, including abductions, massacres, rapes and armed robbery. Several new militant groups with radical Islamic views emerged and changed the ideological emphasis of the movement to Islamic. This was facilitated by a large influx of Islamic "Jihadi" fighters (mujahadeen) who had entered the Kashmir valley following the end of the Soviet–Afghan War in the 1980s.

Following the 2008 Kashmir unrest, secessionist movements in the region were boosted. The 2016–17 Kashmir unrest resulted in the death of over 90 civilians and the injury of over 15,000. Six policemen, including a sub-inspector were killed in an ambush in Anantnag in June 2017, by trespassing militants of the Pakistan-based Lashkar-e-Toiba. An attack on an Indian police convoy in Pulwama, in February 2019, resulted in the deaths of 40 police officers. Responsibility for the attack was claimed by a Pakistan-backed militant group Jaish-e-Mohammed.

Dissolution 
In August 2019, both houses of the Parliament of India passed resolutions to amend Article 370 and extend the Constitution of India in its entirety to the state, which was implemented as a constitutional order by the President of India. At the same time, the parliament also passed the Jammu and Kashmir Reorganisation Act, 2019, which contained provisions that dissolved the state of Jammu and Kashmir and established two new union territories: the eponymous union territory of Jammu and Kashmir, and that of Ladakh.

The reorganisation act was assented to by the President of India, and came into effect on 31 October 2019. Prior to these measures, the union government locked down the Kashmir Valley, increased security forces, imposed Section 144 that prevented assembly, and placed political leaders such as former Jammu and Kashmir chief ministers Omar Abdullah and Mehbooba Mufti under house arrest. Internet and phone services were also blocked.

Administrative divisions

The state of Jammu and Kashmir consisted of three divisions: the Jammu Division, the Kashmir Division and Ladakh which are further divided into 22 districts. The Siachen Glacier, while under Indian military control, did not lie under the administration of the state of Jammu and Kashmir. Kishtwar, Ramban, Reasi, Samba, Bandipora, Ganderbal, Kulgam and Shopian were districts formed in 2008.

Districts

Demographics

Jammu and Kashmir was the only state in India with a Muslim-majority population. In the Census of India held in 1961, the first to be conducted after the formation of the state, Islam was practised by 68.31% of the population, while 28.45% followed Hinduism. The proportion of population that practised Islam fell to 64.19% by 1981 but recovered afterward. According to the 2011 census, the last to be conducted in the state, Islam was practised by about 68.3% of the state population, while 28.4% followed Hinduism and small minorities followed Sikhism (1.9%), Buddhism (0.9%) and Christianity (0.3%).

The state's official language was Urdu, which occupied a central space in media, education, religious and political discourses and the legislature of Jammu and Kashmir; the language functioned as a symbol of identity among Muslims of South Asia. The first language of less than 1% of the population, it was regarded as a "neutral" and non-native language of the multilingual region, and broadly accepted by Kashmiri Muslims. The dominant position of Urdu has been criticised for rendering Kashmiri into a functional "minority language," effectively restricting its use to households and family.

The most widely spoken language is Kashmiri, the mother tongue of % of the population according to the 2011 census. Other major languages include Dogri (%), Gojri (%), Pahari (%), Hindi (%), Punjabi (%), Balti, Bateri, Bhadarwahi, Brokskat, Changthang, Ladakhi, Purik, Sheikhgal, Spiti Bhoti, and Zangskari. Additionally, several other languages, predominantly found in neighbouring regions, are also spoken by communities within Jammu and Kashmir: Bhattiyali, Chambeali, Churahi, Gaddi, Hindko, Lahul Lohar, Pangwali, Pattani, Sansi, and Shina.

Government
Jammu and Kashmir was the only state in India which had special autonomy under Article 370 of the Constitution of India, according to which no law enacted by the Parliament of India, except for those in the field of defence, communication and foreign policy, would be extendable in Jammu and Kashmir unless it was ratified by the state legislature of Jammu and Kashmir. The state was able to define the permanent residents of the state who alone had the privilege to vote in state elections, the right to seek government jobs and the ability to own land or property in the state.

Jammu and Kashmir was the only Indian state to have its own official state flag, along with India's national flag, in addition to a separate constitution. Designed by the then ruling National Conference, the flag of Jammu and Kashmir featured a plough on a red background symbolising labour; it replaced the Maharaja's state flag. The three stripes represented the three distinct administrative divisions of the state, namely Jammu, Valley of Kashmir, and Ladakh.

Like all the states of India, Jammu and Kashmir had a multi-party democratic system of governance and had a bicameral legislature. At the time of drafting the Constitution of Jammu and Kashmir, 100 seats were earmarked for direct elections from territorial constituencies. Of these, 25 seats were reserved for the areas of Jammu and Kashmir state that came under Pakistani control; this was reduced to 24 after the 12th amendment of the Constitution of Jammu and Kashmir. After a delimitation in 1988, the total number of seats increased to 111, of which 87 were within Indian-administered territory. The Jammu and Kashmir Assembly had a 6-year term, in contrast to the norm of a 5-year term followed in every other state assemblies. In 2005, it was reported that the Indian National Congress-led government in the state intended to amend the term to bring parity with the other states.

Central provisions 
In 1990, an Armed Forces (Special Powers) Act of India, which gave special powers to the Indian security forces, including the detaining of individuals for up to two years without presenting charges, was enforced in Jammu and Kashmir, a decision which drew criticism from Human Rights Watch and Amnesty International for violating human rights. Security forces claimed that many missing people were not detained, but had crossed into Pakistan-administered Kashmir to engage in militancy.

Economy
The economy of Jammu and Kashmir was predominantly dependent on agriculture and related activities. Horticulture played a vital role in the economic development of the state; produce included apples, apricots, cherries, pears, plums, almonds and walnuts. The Doda district, rich in high-grade sapphire, had active mines until the 1989 insurgency; in 1998, the government discovered that smugglers had occupied these mines and stolen much of the resource. Industrial development was constrained by the extreme mountainous landscape and power shortage.  Along with horticulture and agriculture, tourism is an important industry for Jammu and Kashmir, accounting for about 7% to its economy.

Jammu and Kashmir was one of the largest recipients of grants from India; in 2004, this amounted to US$812 million. Tourism, which was integral to the economy, witnessed a decline owing to the insurgency, but foreign tourism later rebounded, and in 2009, the state was one among the top tourist destinations in India. The economy was also benefited by Hindu pilgrims who visited the shrines of Vaishno Devi and Amarnath Temple annually. The British government had reiterated its advise against all travel to Jammu and Kashmir in 2013, with certain exceptions.

See also

 Indian White Paper on Jammu and Kashmir

Notes

References

Citations

Sources

Further reading
 
 

Jammu and Kashmir (state)
1952 establishments in India
2019 disestablishments in India
Disputed territories in Asia
History of the Republic of India
States and territories established in 1952
Territorial disputes of Pakistan
Former states and territories of India